Valerie Saiving (1921–1992) was a feminist theologian. She is the author of the influential essay The Human Situation: A Feminine View.

Biographical details
Valerie Saiving Goldstein was born in 1921, and received her BA from Bates College, Maine, United States in 1943, studying both theology and psychology.  Her University of Chicago Divinity School PhD thesis, The Concepts of Individuality in Whitehead’s Metaphysics, was published in 1966. She was co-founder of the Department of Religious Studies and of the Women's Studies programme at Hobart and William Smith Colleges, Geneva, New York State, where she taught from 1959 to 1987.  She died in 1992.

In 1960, she published an 18-page article in The Journal of Religion, entitled The Human Situation: A Feminine View.  She critiqued contemporary theology largely by means of psychological observations, noting that, whereas little girls learn that they will grow up — just by waiting — to be women, boys on the other hand learn that to be men they must "do something about it. Mere waiting is not enough; to be a man, a boy must prove himself and go on proving himself."

The article had substantial influence on subsequent feminist theologians.  Mary Daly, for example, cited her in her work The Church and the Second Sex, while Judith Plaskow both published a dissertation on Saiving's essay (entitled Sex, Sin and Grace: Women’s Experience and the Theologies of Reinhold Niebuhr and Paul Tillich) and reproduced the 1960 article in her 1979 anthology Womanspirit Rising: A Feminist Reader in Religion.

The Human Situation: A Feminine View
The crux of Saiving's argument in the article is that the focus on pride characteristic of traditional Christian interpretations of sin reflects male experience in a way that is inappropriate to the experience of most, if not all, women, who are much more likely to be prone to "triviality, distractibility, and diffuseness; lack of an organizing center or focus; dependence on others for one's self-definition; tolerance at the expense of standards of excellence ... in short, underdevelopment or negation of the Self."

Fundamentally, Saiving's essay proposes a radical re-definition of 'sin'; one that correctly addresses the female experience. Christianity's view of salvation as a result of selflessness is seen as potentially proscriptive of women who need, in Saiving's opinion, to be encouraged rather than discouraged from asserting themselves as individuals.

Overall, Saiving wished to, "...awaken theologians to the fact that the situation of women, however similar it may appear on the surface of our contemporary world to the situation of man and however much it may be echoed in the life of individual men, is, at bottom, quite different - that the specifically feminine dilemma is, in fact, precisely the opposite of the masculine" (1979, 39). Saiving's work, while much respected in feminist theology, continues to be largely ignored by mainstream theologians.

References

1921 births
1992 deaths
Bates College alumni
Christian feminist theologians
Hobart and William Smith Colleges faculty
American Christian theologians
University of Chicago Divinity School alumni